Saint-Marc is an arrondissement in Artibonite department of Haiti.
It has 268,499 inhabitants.
Postal codes in the Saint-Marc Arrondissement start with the number 43.

The arrondissement consists of the following municipalities:
 Saint-Marc
 La Chapelle
 Verrettes
 Montrouis
Liancourt

References

Arrondissements of Haiti
Artibonite (department)